Saints & Sinners Festival is a two-day hardcore and heavy metal music festival held yearly in New Jersey. It started in 2006 at the Asbury Park Convention Hall on October 28 and October 29. The first day had emo/screamo/post hardcore bands and Atreyu headlined. The second day had metal/hardcore bands and Killswitch Engage headlined. The festival came back in 2007 and was held on November 3 and 4. Against Me! headlined on the 3rd and Glassjaw headlined on the 4th. The festival spun off into a tour in 2009, featuring Senses Fail, Hollywood Undead, Haste the Day, and Brokencyde.

2006
At Rest
A Life Once Lost
All That Remains
Atreyu
Bleeding Through
Cellador
Chiodos
Despised Icon
Drop Dead, Gorgeous
Ed Gein
Escape the Fate
Every Time I Die
Folly
From a Second Story Window
Full Blown Chaos
God Forbid
Heavy Heavy Low Low
Helvetika (local)
Job for a Cowboy
Killswitch Engage
Left to Vanish
Ligeia
Mindless Self Indulgence
NORA
Remembering Never
Sacred Hatred
See You Next Tuesday
Suicide City
The Devil Wears Prada
The Kisscut
The Number Twelve Looks Like You
The Warriors
This Is Hell
Through The Grey (local)
Through the Eyes of the Dead
Unearth
Zero Strikes Back (local)

2007
Saints and Sinners took place on November 3 and 4. The Crusade held competitions for local bands to compete to play at Saints and Sinners. The competition started in July. Prices were $30 for a one-day pass and $57 for a two-day pass. Against Me! headlined the 3rd and Glassjaw headlined the 4th.

November 3
 Against Me!
 Agnostic Front
 August Burns Red
 Bang Camaro
 Bela Kiss
 Drop Dead, Gorgeous
 Elysia
 Four Letter Lie
 Future Cult Classic (local)
 Hip Hop Karaoke
 Horse the Band
 Kaddisfly
 LoveHateHero
 Municipal Waste
 Newlywed Disaster
 Saves the Day
 Strike Anywhere
 The Casualties
 The Number Twelve Looks Like You
 Whitechapel

November 4
 Glassjaw
 A Skylit Drive
 The Agony Scene
 Alexisonfire
 All Shall Perish
 Animosity
 The Banner
 Between the Buried and Me
 Blessthefall
 Dance Gavin Dance
 December Aeternalis
 Envy on the Coast
 From a Second Story Window
 From Autumn to Ashes
 From First to Last
 Ground To Machine (Local)
 Misery Signals
 MyChildren MyBride
 Norma Jean
 Saosin
 Shai Hulud
 Silverstein
 Suicide Silence
 Black Moon (local)
 The Man with Dynamite Hands

References

Heavy metal festivals in the United States